Brent Stait (born September 9, 1959) is a Canadian actor, best known for his roles as Rev Bem in the science fiction television series Andromeda and Louis Ferretti in Stargate SG-1.

Biography
Stait was born in Snow Lake, Manitoba and grew up in The Pas. Though it is commonly said that Stait left Andromeda due to an allergic reaction to the prosthetics his character required, a 2011 interview revealed his departure was motivated by "physical exhaustion" from wearing the full Rev Bem costume.

Stait substituted for the body of Michael Kenmore in his Wraith form in the Stargate Atlantis episode "Allies", though Connor Trinneer continued to provide the voice.  Trinneer returned to the full role after this singular episode as shown in "The Kindred (Part 1)".

Stait played DC Comics superhero Doctor Fate in Absolute Justice, a film that takes place inside the events of the ninth season of the Superman television series Smallville, the first live action appearance of the character. In the movie, Fate is allied with fellow members of the Justice Society and comes into conflict (and later alignment) with the Justice League. Brent Stait received very positive reviews for his portrayal.

He is also known for his portrayal of Nigel Ramsey in "The Wrath of Kali", a fourth season episode of Highlander: The Series.

Filmography

Film

Television

Awards and nominations
For his role of Gary Percy Rils in Those Who Hunt The Wounded Down, Stait was nominated in the 1998 Gemini Awards in the category of Best Performance by an Actor in a Featured Supporting Role in a Dramatic Program or Mini-Series.

In 2003 Stait won a Leo Award in the category of Best Guest Performance by a Male: Dramatic Series for his role in Cold Squad episode "Killing Time".

References

External links
 

1959 births
Living people